The women's shot put event at the 2007 World Championships in Athletics took place on August 26, 2007 at the Nagai Stadium in Osaka, Japan.

Medallists

Abbreviations
All results shown are in metres

Records

Qualification

Group A

Group B

Final

References
Official results, qualification - IAAF.org
Official results, final - IAAF.org
todor66

Shot put
Shot put at the World Athletics Championships
2007 in women's athletics